Mayor of Wells, Somerset, England:

1590: Leonard Crosse
1592: William Watkin
15931594: James Godwyn
1598: John Ayshe
1608: John Ayshe
16131614: James Godwyn
17501751	John Dorset Long
17511752	Thomas Strode
17521753	Charles Tudway
17531754	John Sutton
17541755	Robert Holloway
17551756	Charles Tudway
17561757	Thomas Miller
17571758	William Keate
17581759	John Long
17591760	John Sutton
17601761	William Nicholls
17611762	Charles Tudway
17621763	Joseph Lovell
17631764	Clement Tudway
17641765	Thomas Miller
17651766	Robert Tudway
17661767	William Rood
17671768	Charles Tudway
17681769	James Flood
17691770	Joseph Lovell
17701771	Thomas Millard
17711772	Robert Tudway
17721773	Clement Tudway
17731774	William Rood
17741775	Joseph Lovell
17751776	Clement Tudway
17761777	Thomas Millard
17771778	Robert Tudway
17781779	John Brock
17791780	William Rood
17801781	Clement Tudway
17811782	Joseph Lovell
17821783	Thomas Millard
17831784	William Rood
17841785	Clement Tudway
17851786	John Allford
17861787	John Brock
17871788	Clement Tudway
17881789	Thomas Millard
17891790	John Lovell
17901791	John Allford
17911792	Clement Tudway
17921793	George Lax
17931794	John Brock
17941795	Clement Tudway
17951796	Thomas Millard
17961797	John Lovell
17971798	Clement Tudway
17981799	George Lax
17991800	John Brock
18001801	Robert Lax
18011802	Edward Goldesborough
18021803	George Lax
18031804	Clement Tudway
18041805	Francis Drake
18051806	John Porch
18061807	Robert Lax
18071808	Edward Goldesborough
18081809	Clement Tudway
18091810	George Lax
18101811	John Paine Tudway
18111812	Joseph Teek
18121813	Edward Spencer
18131814	Maurice Davies
18141815	Henry Brookes
18151816	Robert Lax
18161817	Henry Brookes
18171818	Francis Besly
18181819	Joseph Teek
18191820	Henry Brookes
18201821	Stephen Davies
18211822	Henry Hope
18221823	Robert Brooks
18231824	Henry Brookes
18241825	Francis Besly
18251826	Henry Hope
18261827	Henry Brookes
18271828	Edward Spencer
18281829	Stephen Davies
18291830	Robert Welsh
18301831	John Lax
18311832	John Nicholls
18321833	John Lax
18331834	Francis Besly
18341835	Robert Brooks
18351836	Joseph Lovell
18361837	Joseph Lovell
18371838	John Lax
18381839	William Inman Welsh
18391840	Joseph Giles
18401841	John Fry
18411842	William Inman Welsh
18421843	John Belfour Plowman
18431844	James Garrod
18441845	William Perkins
18451846	James Garrod
18461847	John Belfour Plowman
18471848	Henry Bernard
18481849	Henry Bernard
18491850	Edward Nicklin Wells
18501851	Edward Nicklin Wells
1855-? (13 times by 1887) John Gifford Everett
18901892 Jonathan Slater
18971898 James Tate
19021904 Sidney Tom Richards (Conservative)
19131919  G.W. Wheeler
19211922 William Reakes
19231924 Edwin Crease
1926 Edwin Crease
19471949 Ernest Sheldon
19541956 Florence (Flooray) Melrose
19631965 Lillian M Osmond
19701971 Wilhelmina Pinching
19741975	David Tudway Quilter
19751976	Neil Mitchell
19761977	George Algar
19771978	Christine Stiles
19781979	Harry Parkes
19791980	Ernest Wright
19801981	Christina Baron
19811982	Helen Barrett
19821983	Stephen Fowler
19831984	Eileen Giles
19841985	Graham Livings
19851986	Peter Wride
19861987	Nan Rennett
19871988	Norman Kennedy
19881989	Pat Robinson
19891990	Josephine Robinson
19901991	Harvey Siggs
19911992	Sheila Pierce
19921993	Alan Hague
19931994	Kate Fry
19941995	John Howett
19951996	Nick Denison
19961997	Isobel Marshall
19971998	Roy Mackenzie
19981999	Rosemary Woods
19992000	Maureen Brandon
20002001	Desmond Gripper
20012002	David Anderson
20022003	Jean Hague
20032004	Colin Price
20042005	Harvey Siggs
20052006	Norman Kennedy
20062007	Simon Davies
20072008	David Anderson
20082009	Christina Borastero
20092010	Christina Borastero
20102011	Tony Robbins
20112012	Danny Unwin
20122013	Maureen Brandon
20132014	Theo Butt Philip
20142015	Chris Briton
20152016	Gordon Wilson
20162017	Alison Gibson
20172018 John North
20182019 Celia Wride
20192020 John Osman
20202021 Philip Welch (647th mayor)

References

Wells, Somerset
Wells